A list of notable Italian Liberal Party politicians:

A
Renato Altissimo
Giovanni Amendola

B
Luigi Barzini, Jr.
Bortolo Belotti
Alfredo Biondi
Manlio Brosio
Pietro Bucalossi

C
Roberto Cassinelli
Leone Cattani
Raffaele Costa
Benedetto Croce

D
Giuseppe De Capitani D'Arzago
Raffaele De Caro
Paolo De Castro
Francesco De Lorenzo
Enrico De Nicola

E
Luigi Einaudi

G
 Giancarlo Galan
 Fabio Gava
 Niccolò Ghedini
 Giuseppe Grassi (politico)
 Paolo Guzzanti

M
Benedetto Majorana della Nicchiara
Giovanni Francesco Malagodi
Antonio Martino
Francesco Martino
Gaetano Martino

P
Dino Philipson
Sergio Pininfarina

S
Carlo Scognamiglio
Vittorio Sgarbi
Edgardo Sogno

V
Bruno Villabruna

Z
Valerio Zanone

 
Liberal